Lower Berkshire Valley is a census-designated place (CDP) in Roxbury and Jefferson townships, Morris County, New Jersey, United States. It is primarily in the northeast part of Roxbury, along Berkshire Valley Road. Interstate 80 passes through the southern part of the CDP, but with no direct access.

The community was first listed as a CDP during the 2020 census.

References 

Census-designated places in Morris County, New Jersey
Census-designated places in New Jersey
Jefferson Township, New Jersey
Roxbury Township, New Jersey